Pacer, originally titled Formula Fusion, is a futuristic racing video game developed by British independent studio R8 Games for Microsoft Windows, PlayStation 4 and Xbox One. It was initially set to release on September 17, 2020.  However, it was delayed until the end of September 2020. On October 19, R8 announced that the game would be released on October 29.

A kickstarter campaign by R8 Games was successful in securing over £79,000 to begin development on the game which was released as an early access version through Steam in August 2015. The game was re-branded from Formula Fusion to Pacer in early 2019.

The game started as a spiritual successor to the Wipeout series with some of the early R8 Games staff having worked on Wipeout 3 for Psygnosis Leeds. R8 Games founder Andrew Walker was part of the team that were awarded a BAFTA for best design on Wipeout 3 in 1999. The Designers Republic, the graphic design studio that designed visual assets and marketing for the first three Wipeout games, has also contributed to the game.

The game uses the Unreal 4 game engine with modifications to the open source code to enhance the feeling of speed.

Reception

Formula Fusion received very mixed reviews upon exiting early access. Critics praised the graphics, the sound, and claimed that the game felt very true to the Wipeout series, while heavily criticizing the insubstantial amount of content as well as unforeseen bugs. Many critics claimed that the game felt unfinished and not ready for full release outside of early access.

Pacer opened to more positive reception, receiving "mixed or average" reviews for PC and "generally positive" reviews for PlayStation 4 and Xbox One.

CGM lamented the game's lack of accessibility, online player-base, and controls, while praising the game's soundtrack, graphics, customization, and its ability to live up to the legacy of Wipeout. Hardcore Gamer wrote positively about the game, stating, "Fans of either F-Zero or Wipeout will undeniably and thoroughly enjoy PACER...The game is fast and beautiful and offers more depth with a variety of racing" while criticizing the lack of online functionality and purchasable in-game content. Push Square praised the wide variety of modes and content, and speedy gameplay while criticizing the forgettable racing teams and the UI, calling it "clumsy".

References

External links
Pacer on Steam
Delay announcement on twitter

2020 video games
Science fiction racing games
PlayStation 4 games
Windows games
Video games developed in the United Kingdom
Xbox One games
Early access video games
Multiplayer and single-player video games